The 1910–11 Dartmouth men's ice hockey season was the 6th season of play for the program.

Season
On their third head coach in three years, Dartmouth began the season well but sputtered in their intercollegiate games and finished with a losing but improved record. 

Note: Dartmouth College did not possess a moniker for its athletic teams until the 1920s, however, the university had adopted 'Dartmouth Green' as its school color in 1866.

Roster

Standings

Schedule and Results

|-
!colspan=12 style=";" | Regular Season

References

Dartmouth Big Green men's ice hockey seasons
Dartmouth
Dartmouth
Dartmouth
Dartmouth